Naru Island is a small island in the New Georgia Islands of the Western Province of the Solomon Islands.

The island is primarily notable for its role in the events after the sinking of PT-109 involving future American president John F. Kennedy.

See also
Kennedy Island
Olasana Island

Islands of the Solomon Islands
Western Province (Solomon Islands)